James Fieser is professor of philosophy at the University of Tennessee at Martin. He received his B.A. from Berea College, and his M.A. and Ph.D. in philosophy from Purdue University. He is founder and general editor of the Internet Encyclopedia of Philosophy. He is author, coauthor or editor of more than ten text books. Fieser is also known for being the guitarist in the hit band Oxford Street Band.

Bibliography

References

Living people
University of Tennessee at Martin faculty
Philosophy academics
Hume scholars
Berea College alumni
Purdue University alumni
American ethicists
20th-century American philosophers
21st-century American philosophers
Historians of philosophy
Year of birth missing (living people)